Praisaniyakarn, written as Praisaneeyakan (lit: Post Office Building) is the original location of the Post Department, which was Thailand’s first postal office. The office stood on the eastern bank of Chao Phraya River, at the mouth of Khlong Ong Ang (Ong Ang Canal) in Phra Nakhon side near the area of Pak Khlong Talat, right on the south of Memorial Bridge.  It is a three-storey striking white Western-style building.

Previously being spelled in Thai in another way, "Praisaniyakarn"  (ไปรสะนียาคาร) building was built in 1871 as the residence of Phra Preecha Kolakan (Samang Amatayakul), the former governor of Prachinburi, eastern Siam (former name of Thailand) who was later charged with treason for the corruption in the operation of a gold mine in Kabin Buri. Phra Preecha Kolakan was executed  on November 24, 1879 and his assets were seized.

King Chulalongkorn (Rama V) had borne the divine kindness in the establishment of the Thai postal service on August 4, 1883. Prince Bhanurangsi Savangwongse chaired the first director-general of the Post and Telegraph Department and had used the residence of Phra Preecha Kolakan as the postal office by naming it "Praisaniyakarn".

In the revolution of 1932, Praisaniyakarn was the first target that the People’s Party (Khana Ratsadon) had eyed to seize as it was the communication hub in which telegramming and phoning system must be cut off. The mission was led by the civil faction of the People’s Party, comprising Khuang Abhaiwongse and Prayoon Pamornmontri, the latter who previously worked here before and knew well of inside movements. Guarded by a few members of the navy faction of the People’s Party, the seizure and communication suspensions had to start by 4:00 a.m. and must be complete no later than 5:00 a.m. to prevent suspicion of outsiders. Despite the success of the People’s Party, one staff fled and reported to the police at Chakkrawat Police Station nearby. Then Police Lieutenant General Phraya Athikarnprakat (Loui Chatikavanij) who served as director-general of Police Department, hastened to Bangkhunphrom Palace to report the situation to Fleet Admiral Paribatra Sukhumbandhu, Prince of Nakhon Sawan, who served as the regent.

Praisaniyakarn was demolished in 1982 for the construction of Phra Pok Klao Bridge on the occasion of the 200th-anniversary celebration of Rattanakosin Kingdom (Bangkok), which parallels Memorial Bridge on the south side. The current building is a replica built on the plot of land nearest to the original site in order to use as the Thailand’s postal museum. It was built in 2003 by the Department of Highways with a budget of six million baht completed in 2010.

See also
Siamese revolution of 1932
Bangkok General Post Office
Thai Philatelic Museum

References

External links

Phra Nakhon district
Buildings and structures in Bangkok
Museums in Bangkok
Buildings and structures on the Chao Phraya River